Batus is a genus of beetles in the family Cerambycidae, containing the following species:

 Batus barbicornis (Linnaeus, 1764)
 Batus hirticornis (Gyllenhal in Schoenherr, 1817)
 Batus latreillei (White, 1853)

References

Trachyderini
Taxa named by Carl Peter Thunberg